Paige Arielle "McFierce" McPherson  (born October 1, 1990, in Abilene, Texas) is an Olympic taekwondo competitor from the United States.

Biography

Early life and education 
McPherson grew up in Sturgis, South Dakota. She and four other siblings were adopted by Susan and Dave McPherson. Her biological family includes an older brother and two half-siblings. She is of African American and Filipino descent. She graduated from Black Hills Classical Christian Academy in 2009 and then went on to attend Miami-Dade College.

Career 
McPherson was a silver medalist at the 2011 Pan Am Games.

She represented the USA at the 2012 Summer Olympics in the women’s 67 kg taekwondo event and in the preliminary round secured a surprise defeat over Team GB's Sarah Stevenson. McPherson went on to win a bronze medal by defeating Franka Anić of Slovenia, 8-3.

After winning a gold medal in the 2016 Pan American Games McPherson was selected to represent the United States as a member of the Team USA Taekwondo Team in the 2016 Summer Olympics in Rio, Brazil.  At the 2016 Summer Olympics, she lost her first match against Farida Azizova.

She has qualified to represent the United States at the 2020 Summer Olympics.

References

External links

1990 births
Sportspeople from Abilene, Texas
Sportspeople from South Dakota
American martial artists of Filipino descent
American female taekwondo practitioners
Living people
Taekwondo practitioners at the 2012 Summer Olympics
Taekwondo practitioners at the 2011 Pan American Games
Olympic bronze medalists for the United States in taekwondo
Pan American Games silver medalists for the United States
Medalists at the 2012 Summer Olympics
People from Sturgis, South Dakota
Miami Dade College alumni
Pan American Games gold medalists for the United States
Taekwondo practitioners at the 2016 Summer Olympics
Pan American Games medalists in taekwondo
Taekwondo practitioners at the 2015 Pan American Games
World Taekwondo Championships medalists
Pan American Taekwondo Championships medalists
Taekwondo practitioners at the 2019 Pan American Games
Medalists at the 2011 Pan American Games
Medalists at the 2015 Pan American Games
Medalists at the 2019 Pan American Games
Taekwondo practitioners at the 2020 Summer Olympics
21st-century American women